Fort Green is located in northwestern portion of present-day Hardee County, Florida. Twenty families forted-up there for protection during the Third Seminole War. In 1856, was the home site of James Dopson Green, and subsequently named after him.

References

Green